Bauerius ansorgii is a species of gecko, a lizard in the family Gekkonidae. The species is indigenous to the west coast of Southern Africa.

Etymology
The specific name, ansorgii, is in honor of William John Ansorge, a physician who collected natural history specimens in Africa.

Geographic range
B. ansorgii is endemic to Angola.

Habitat

Description
Dorsally, it is pale grayish brown. Ventrally, it is white with small brown spots. The upper lip is also white.

Behavior
B. ansorgii is nocturnal. It shelters by day in hollow branches of blackthorn (Senegalia mellifera), the branches having been made hollow by termite activity. It emerges at night to forage.

Reproduction
B. ansorgii is oviparous.

References

Further reading
Bauer AM, Good DA, Branch WR (1997). "The taxonomy of the Southern African leaf-toed geckos (Squamata: Gekkonidae), with a review of Old World "Phyllodactylus " and the description of five new genera". Proceedings of the California Academy of Sciences 49 (14): 447–497. (Afrogecko ansorgii, new combination, p. 476).
Boulenger GA (1907). "Descriptions of Three new Lizards and a new Frog, discovered by Dr. W. J. Ansorge in Angola". Annals and Magazine of Natural History, Seventh Series 19: 212–214. (Phyllodactylus ansorgii, new species, p. 212).
Vaz Pinto P, Veríssimo L, Branch WR (2019). "Hiding in the bushes for 110 years: rediscovery of an iconic Angolan gecko (Afrogecko ansorgii Boulenger, 1907, Sauria: Gekkonidae)". Amphibian & Reptile Conservation 13 (2) [Special Section]: 29–41.

Gekkonidae
Reptiles of Angola
Endemic fauna of Angola
Taxa named by George Albert Boulenger
Reptiles described in 1907